Eugène Fournier (1871–1941) was a French caver and geologist.

1871 births
1941 deaths
French cavers
French geologists